Hubback is a surname. Notable people with the surname include:

Arthur Benison Hubback (1871–1948), English architect
Catherine Hubback (1818–1877), English novelist
Eva Marian Hubback (1886–1949), English feminist
George Hubback (1882–1955), English Anglican priest
Gordon Hubback (1902–1970), British Royal Navy admiral
Theodore Hubback (1872–1942), English engineer, conservationist and author